Iowa Iron Works, renamed Dubuque Boat and Boiler Works in 1904, was a manufacturing company established in Dubuque, Iowa in 1883.

Notable Boats

Sprague built in 1901, was the world's largest  steam powered sternwheeler towboat. A model of Sprague is in the National Mississippi River Museum and Aquarium in Dubuque, Iowa.

United States Coast Guard inland construction tender  built 1943–1944, was designated Queen of the Fleet, the Coast Guard's oldest commissioned cutter, in April 2011.

References

Manufacturing companies established in 1883